Walter Damián Montillo (born 14 April 1984) is an Argentine former footballer who played as an attacking midfielder.

Career

San Lorenzo 
He began in the youth ranks of Argentine club San Lorenzo and his professional debut came in 2002. In 2006, he moved to Mexican side Monarcas Morelia. He was a fixture in the starting line-up for the Mexican club. He returned to San Lorenzo in 2007, but did not find regularity with the first team, only playing six games.

In 2008, he was sold to Universidad de Chile for $1 million and signed a five-year contract with the club. At the time the price tag was the most ever paid by a Chilean club.  However, since the move, Colo-Colo paid $1.2 million for Domingo Salcedo and then paid $2.2 for Macnelly Torres.

Universidad de Chile 
Actuating at Universidad de Chile, after a poor beginning, he started becoming a notorious player, as well as one of the La Us most respectable ones, considered by the manager Sergio Markarián itself the one who usually commanded the moves in the team. In the 2010 Copa Libertadores, he obtained visibility in Brazil, after good appearances in the matches against Flamengo, doing even a beautiful coverage goal in the second match.

Although losing it, they won over Flamengo by away goal. During the competition, Montillo dedicated his goals to his newborn baby Santino, who has Down syndrome; he grew visibly emotional after the crowd then chanted in support of Santino.

During the campaign in La U into Libertadores, Montillo became harassed in many Brazilian teams, including Flamengo and Vasco da Gama, but the one who really did get the Argentinean midfielder was Cruzeiro; even though his contract renew with Universidad de Chile until 2014, after rejecting the Flamengo's offer. His hiring at the Celeste squad was announced on July 2 by US$3.5 million, and he joined the club after Universidad de Chile finished playing the Copa Libertadores, which the team left in the semifinals.

Cruzeiro

2010 
On 15 August, he made his debut against São Paulo FC, in a 2–2 away draw, making an assist to the 83rd-minute goal by Thiago Ribeiro. Montillo scored his first goal against Corinthians in a 1–0 win in the 3rd minute, match that took in place in Uberlândia. Besides conducting the team's midfield, he showed himself as a scorer as never did before — in 15 matches, he scored 7 times, beating his total score at San Lorenzo, which he considered the best moment in its career —. With Montillo, the squad's avail increased from 50% to 62%.

In 2010's December 5, after Cruzeiro get the runner-up in the Brazilian League, montillo was laureate with the Armando Nogueira Trophy as the best player in the competition. In the following day, he got Placars Bola de Prata as one of the best midfielders of the League, receiving it from the hands of Sorín — an oldschool idol in Cruzeiro.

2011 
In 2011, at the first match in the Copa Libertadores done by Cruzeiro in the year, Montillo scored twice, as well as giving assistance in the rout over the Argentinean Estudiantes by 5-0 — in a beautiful spectacle that had a special taste for Cruzeiro, once their last match was played their elimination at the 2009 Copa Libertadores by 1–2 at the Mineirão —. Wondrously, the Celeste squad was eliminated at the round of, against Colombian Once Caldas, a fact that shocked supporters and the South America's media.

In the Brazilian league, after being criticized along the entire Cruzeiro squad, which began very poorly the championship, Montillo recovered its football with the arising of the manager Joel Santana. He did the two goals of the victory over Grêmio by the 8th round, on July 6, getting the best scorer position in the league for a few rounds. Diverging among the bad Cruzeiro appearance in the Brazilian League in that year, Montillo then won his second Bola de Prata followed by the title as one of the best midfielders in the league again. In 2011, he was the Argentinean midfielder who most scored in all the world.

2012 
In 2012's 25 February, Montillo became Cruzeiro's biggest foreign scorer of all time since 1942 — when the team left its old name Palestra Itália —, after scoring twice against Democrata, reaching the mark of 30 goals, beating Víctor Aristizábal, which scored 28 times with the Celeste uniform.
In March, the player renewed its contract to actuate in Cruzeiro until the end of 2015. Cruzeiro's president Gilvan Tavares increased the termination fine to €80 million, making Montillo the most expensive player in the South America.

Santos 

On 3 January 2013, through Twitter, Santos announced Montillo as their player for next season. Despite the undisclosed negotiation, it is thought that Montillo was bought for R$16 million. Montillo must wear shirt number 10, that was worn until 2012 by Paulo Henrique Ganso. The coach of the club, Muricy Ramalho, praised his coming. The player made his debut wearing the shirt of Peixe on January 16, 2013, when the club won Grêmio Barueri for 4–0. Montillo approved the victory and his partnership with Neymar, who he praised.

Shandong Luneng 
In January 2014, Montillo joined Chinese side Shandong Luneng for approximately €7.5 million.

Botafogo 
In December 2016, it was announced that Montillo joined Botafogo. He made his 2017 Campeonato Brasileiro Série A debut on 26 June 2017 against Avaí starting the match but being replaced after only seven minutes due to a calf injury, having suffered the same injury twice in the previous months.

Montillo announced his retirement on 29 June 2017.

International career 
He played for Argentina U20 in the 2003 FIFA World Youth Championship in United Arab Emirates.  He played in most of the team's games. Recently, he was called by Alejandro Sabella to play the second match of the mini-tournament "Superclássico das Américas" against Brazil, where only players who were playing in South America could be called, wearing the number 7. Although the loss by 2–0, Montillo was very praised by the Argentinean media. He was called again to represent Argentina in the friendly match against Sweden on 6 February 2013, but he remained on the bench the 90 minutes.

He made his first full appearance for the national team against Venezuela in a World Cup qualification match on 22 March 2013. His acting in this game was praised by coach of Santos, Montillo's club, Muricy Ramalho. According to Ramalho, the Argentinian "was very well. He is improving step by step." On 7 June 2013 against Colombia he was one of the starting eleven, substituting the injured Lionel Messi.

After football 
In 2021, he became a football agent and joined BYP Argentina, a football agency.

At the same time he is a football agent, he performs as an author. His first book, Gracias a la vida (Thanks to life), is an autobiography published in 2021 that includes a prologue of Neymar. In 2022 he published Carlitos Cachaña, a children's book about a child who dreams of being a professional footballer.

Career statistics

International appearances and goals

Honours

Club 
San Lorenzo
 Copa Sudamericana (1): 2002

Universidad de Chile
 Primera División de Chile (1): 2009 Apertura

Cruzeiro
 Campeonato Mineiro (1): 2011

Shandong Luneng
 Chinese FA Cup (1): 2014
 Chinese FA Super Cup (1): 2015

Individual 
 Campeonato Brasileiro Série A Team of the Year: 2010
 Bola de Prata: 2010, 2011

See also 
 List of athletes who came out of retirement

References

External links 
 
 
 Walter Montillo – Argentine Primera statistics at Fútbol XXI 

1984 births
Living people
Sportspeople from Lanús
Argentine footballers
Argentina international footballers
Argentina under-20 international footballers
Argentine expatriate footballers
Association football midfielders
San Lorenzo de Almagro footballers
Atlético Morelia players
Universidad de Chile footballers
Cruzeiro Esporte Clube players
Santos FC players
Shandong Taishan F.C. players
Botafogo de Futebol e Regatas players
Club Atlético Tigre footballers
Argentine Primera División players
Liga MX players
Chilean Primera División players
Chinese Super League players
Campeonato Brasileiro Série A players
Primera Nacional players
Expatriate footballers in Mexico
Expatriate footballers in Chile
Expatriate footballers in Brazil
Expatriate footballers in China
Argentine expatriate sportspeople in Mexico
Argentine expatriate sportspeople in Chile
Argentine expatriate sportspeople in Brazil
Argentine expatriate sportspeople in China
Argentine writers